Irving Peake Johnson (November 5, 1866 – March 1, 1947) was an American prelate, who served as Bishop of Colorado from 1918 to 1938.

Early life and education
Johnson was born on November 5, 1866, in Hudson, New York, the son of William Ross Johnson and Adeline Dickinson. He was educated at the Union Classical Institute in Schenectady, New York, and later at Union College, from where he graduated with a Bachelor of Arts in 1887, and awarded an honorary Doctor of Divinity in 1912. He then studied at General Theological Seminary, graduating with a Bachelor of Divinity in 1891. He was awarded a Doctor of Sacred Theology from the University of Denver in 1919, a Doctor of Laws in 1923 from Colorado College, and another Doctor of Divinity in 1927 from the University of Colorado.

Ordained Ministry
Johnson was ordained deacon on June 3, 1891, by Bishop John Williams of Connecticut, and priest October 18, 1891, by Bishop George Worthington of Nebraska. He married Grace W. Keese on June 18, 1894. Between 1891 and 1901, he was a missionary in Omaha, Nebraska, notably rector of St Andrew's Church between 1891 and 1894, and then as rector of St Martin's Church between 1894 and 1901. In 1901, he became rector of Gethsemane Church in Minneapolis, Minnesota, while in 1913, he became Professor of Church History at the Seabury-Western Theological Seminary.

Episcopacy
Johnson was elected Coadjutor Bishop of Colorado on June 8, 1916, during the 30th Annual Council of the Diocese of Colorado, and was consecrated on January 1, 1917, by Presiding Bishop Daniel S. Tuttle. He succeeded as diocesan bishop upon the death of Bishop Olmsted on October 21, 1918. He retained the post until his retirement in 1938. He died on March 1, 1947, after an illness of several months.

References 

"Consecration of Bishop Coadjutor of Colorado", The Living Church, January 20, 1917, p. 391.

1866 births
1947 deaths
People from Hudson, New York
General Theological Seminary alumni
Union College (New York) alumni
Episcopal bishops of Colorado